Xenomigia wilmeri is a moth of the family Notodontidae first described by James S. Miller in 2011. It is found in north-eastern Ecuador.

The length of the forewings is 14–18 mm. The ground colour of the forewings is chocolate brown, the veins thinly lined with whitish orange. The basal half of the hindwings is translucent light grey brown with an extremely wide, translucent, dark grey outer band.

The larvae have been reared on Chusquea cf. scandens.

Etymology
The species is named in honour of Wilmer Simbaña, field manager for the Caterpillars and Parasitoids of the Eastern Andes in Ecuador project.

References

Moths described in 2011
Notodontidae of South America